Twesten is a surname. Notable people with the surname include:

August Detlev Christian Twesten (1789–1876), German Lutheran theologian
Elke Twesten (born 1963), German politician
Karl Twesten (1820–1870), German politician and author

See also
Westen